Jenő Németh (born 1902, date of death unknown) was a Hungarian wrestler. He competed in the Greco-Roman featherweight event at the 1924 Summer Olympics.

References

External links
 

1902 births
Year of death missing
Olympic wrestlers of Hungary
Wrestlers at the 1924 Summer Olympics
Hungarian male sport wrestlers
Martial artists from Budapest
20th-century Hungarian people